Woodland Pristava is an electronic dance music festival held annually since 2013. Takes place at the first weekend in July at the Pristava in Stična, Slovenia. Headliners have included Armin van Buuren, David Guetta, W&W, etc. It is Slovenia's leading electronic music festival.

Events

Woodland Pristava 2013
The first edition of Woodland Festival took place 5–6 July 2013. 10.000 people passed through the festival's gates over those 2 days and the 2 stages were crowded with over 20 artists. 
Lineup: Mike Candys, Carl Cox, Umek, Ran-D, Alex Gaudino, Odesza, Krafty Kuts, Vanillaz, Sasha Lopez, Beltek, Sylvain, Marien Baker, Deejaytime, Clay Clemens, Kasnich Brothers, Miss K8, DJ YOCO, Far Ahead

Woodland Pristava 2014
The second edition of Woodland Festival took place 4–6 July 2014. More than 30, 000 people passed through the festival's gates over those 3 days and the 4 stages were crowded with over 30 artists.
Lineup: W&W, Yves V, DJ Antoine, Vinai, Markus Schulz, Carl Cox, Laidback Luke, Umek, Chuckie, Krewella, Gramatik, GLOWINTHEDARK, Djs from Mars, Sven Väth, Joris Voorn, Eva Shaw, Vanillaz, Sasha Lopez, Beltek, Viktoria Metzker, Shermanology, Clay Clemens

Woodland Pristava 2015
The latest edition of Woodland Festival took place from 5–7 July 2015. More than 75.000 people passed through the festival's gates over those 3 days and the 5 stages were crowded with over 40 artists.
Lineup: Armin van Buuren, David Guetta, Oliver Heldens, R3hab, Nervo, Vinai, Vicetone, Showtek, Umek, Kaskade, Sander van Doorn, Knife Party, Djs from Mars, Jay Hardway, Shapeshifters, Shermanology, Vanillaz, Sasha Lopez, Beltek, Viktoria Metzker, Shermanology

External links

Electronic music festivals in Slovenia